Sally Jennifer Meen (born 13 June 1965) is an English television presenter.

Meen has a degree in Catering and Institutional Management, and latterly qualifications in Art and Design. Her TV career started out as a dancer on Benny Hill, then a continuity announcer on TSW, before becoming a weather presenter on GMTV. She then moved to become the hostess for two years on BBC TV's Jim Davidson's The Generation Game in 1995.

She has presented on Talk Radio and 963 Liberty Radio in London, as well as appearing on satellite TV stations: TV Travel Shop, Thomas Cook TV, Carlton Food Network.

Personal life
Meen became engaged to Caron Keating's widower Russ Lindsay on Christmas Day 2005. The couple married in September 2006. They have two daughters Tilly Jennifer Lindsay (born 14 March 2008) and Fiona Lottie Lindsay (born 8 July 2010). Lindsay has two sons, Charlie and Gabriel, from his marriage to Keating. Meen is the maternal half-sister of actor Matthew Goode.

References

External links

Pictures at TV ARK

1965 births
Living people
British television presenters
English radio presenters
GMTV presenters and reporters
Mass media people from Devon